"Innocent Eyes" is a song written by Delta Goodrem and Vince Pizzinga and produced by John Fields for Goodrem's first album, Innocent Eyes (2003). It was released as the album's third single in Australia on 9 June 2003. Goodrem has stated the song is one of her favourite tracks on the Innocent Eyes album and that its lyrics are autobiographical, and is dedicated to her family. The song became her third number-one single in Australia and also peaked in the top twenty in the United Kingdom and New Zealand. She also performed the song on an episode of Australian soap opera Neighbours where she had a starring role as Nina Tucker.

Music video
The music video for "Innocent Eyes" was filmed in the Intercontinental Hotel in Sydney, Australia, and was directed by Michael Gracey. It was filmed between 2 May 2003 – 3 May 2003 and was released in June that same year. The video shows Delta Goodrem backstage waiting to go on and reminiscing about being a little girl (played by Morgan Griffin) doing things like singing, dancing and dressing up. It took twenty hours in total to film the video and she felt it hard trying to put the film clip in other people's hands because she feels that it was her song and was wrenching when people tamper with it to try for marketing. The video, with behind the scenes, is available on Goodrem's first DVD Delta (2003).

Promotion and chart performance
Promotion for the single included a Melbourne instore appearance in which Goodrem signed autographs for a record eight hours to an estimated crowd of 10,000 people. Two CD singles were released to stores in Australia, the first CD featured the title track and the two B-sides "Hear Me Calling" (written by Goodrem and Pizzinga) and "Lost for Words" (written by Goodrem), while the second CD featured remixes of "Lost Without You", a free Delta Goodrem phone logo and a choice of ringtones between "Born to Try", "Lost Without You" and "Innocent Eyes".

The song made its debut on the Australia ARIA Singles Chart at number two, being held off the number-one spot by "Bring Me to Life" by Evanescence on 16 June 2003. After two weeks on being in the charts it knocked Evanescence off the top spot and stayed there for two weeks, making Goodrem's third consecutive number-one single. After nine weeks the song spent its last week in the top ten and fell to number 12. It spent a total of twenty weeks in the top fifty, accredited platinum by ARIA and was the eighteenth highest selling single in Australia for 2003. The song was released late October 2003 in New Zealand and made its debut in the chart at a low forty-four but the next week it had a better week jumping twenty-five places to number 19, before peaking the following week at fourteen. It spent a total of twelve weeks in the chart leaving at number 49.

22 September 2003 was the released date for the song in Ireland and the United Kingdom where the song showed success. The song debuted at number nine in the UK becoming Goodrem's third top ten single there. It debuted and peaked at number 25 in Ireland but fell out of the charts from then on spending a total on six weeks in the chart.

Track listings

Credits and personnel
Credits are lifted from the Innocent Eyes album booklet.

Studios
 Produced, recorded, and arranged at Mansfield Lodge, Conway (Los Angeles), and Metropolis Audio (Melbourne, Australia)
 Mastered at Sterling Sound (New York City)

Personnel

 Delta Goodrem – writing, piano
 Vince Pizzinga – writing
 John Fields – guitars, bass, keyboards, production, recording, arrangement
 Phil Solem – guitars
 Mike Ruekberg – baritone guitar
 David Falzone – piano
 Dorian Crozier – drums
 Billy Hawn – percussion
 Ameena Khawaja – cello
 Sam Storey – studio assistant (Conway)
 Robbie Adams – studio assistant (Metropolis)
 Carl Schubert – studio assistant (Metropolis)
 Michael H. Brauer – mixing
 Greg Calbi – mastering

Charts

Weekly charts

Year-end charts

Certifications

Release history

References

2003 singles
2003 songs
Delta Goodrem songs
Epic Records singles
Number-one singles in Australia
Song recordings produced by John Fields (record producer)
Songs written by Delta Goodrem
Songs written by Vince Pizzinga